Winger is an American rock band. Formed in New York City, Winger gained popularity during the late 1980s and early 1990s. The band's two platinum albums, Winger and In the Heart of the Young, along with charting singles "Seventeen", "Headed for a Heartbreak" and "Miles Away", put them on the top of the charts by the early 1990s. In 1990, the band was nominated for an American Music Award for "Best New Heavy Metal Band". As the music scene changed in the early to mid-1990s due to the popularity of grunge, their success faded following their third release, Pull.

Winger disbanded in 1994. In 2001 they reunited and have since conducted several successful tours. In 2006, the band's 1993 touring lineup (minus Paul Taylor but including John Roth) reunited to record the band's first studio album in over 13 years, IV, and toured in support of the album into 2008.

In 2009, the band released their fifth album, Karma. As of 2013, Winger was performing on mini-tours, festivals and private events. Their most recent album, Better Days Comin', came out in 2014.

History

1980: Early use of the name Winger

The first release under the name Winger was a Denver Rainbow Music Hall live recording of the song "Wizard of the Key" on the KAZY Thunder on the Mountain compilation in 1980. The lineup featured brothers Kip, Nate, and Paul Winger and their friend Peter Fletcher (later a member of L.A.'s Pigmy Love Circus).

1987–1994: Main career and breakup

The debut album, Winger, was released on August 10, 1988, on Atlantic Records. The record was a success, achieving platinum status in the United States, and gold status in Japan and Canada. On February 11, 1989, the album peaked at number 21 on the Billboard 200, and was in various places on the chart for 63 weeks. Radio and MTV hits from the album included "Madalaine", "Seventeen", "Headed for a Heartbreak" and "Hungry". In 1990, the band was nominated for an American Music Award for "Best New Heavy Metal Band".

Shortly after that tour, Winger released its second album In the Heart of the Young, which went 1-and-1/2 platinum in the U.S. and gold in Japan. Hit radio tracks and MTV videos included "Can't Get Enuff", "Miles Away" and "Easy Come Easy Go".

Winger followed the release of its second album with a 13-month world tour, playing over 230 dates with Kiss, Scorpions, ZZ Top, Extreme and Slaughter. Paul Taylor left the band after the tour, citing exhaustion after years of touring. Their third studio album, Pull, produced by Mike Shipley, was recorded in 1992/1993 as a three-piece band. It was originally to be called Blind Revolution Mad, after the opening song. Reportedly Kip Winger, anticipating that critics would dismiss the album out of hand, renamed it Pull as a tongue-in-cheek reference to the CD being used by critics as a skeet shooting target. The album was not as successful as the previous albums saleswise, but gained solid reviews. On the following tour, John Roth was called in to replace Paul Taylor on rhythm guitar. The album coincided with the rise of grunge, which swept aside the brand of melodic pop-metal that Winger represented.

In the 1990s, Winger was subject to mockery from MTV's animated series Beavis and Butt-Head. Series creator Mike Judge later revealed that he had been incorrectly informed that Kip Winger had asked the network not to make jokes about the band on the series, which led to further jokes about the band, but later learned from Winger himself that he had never made any such stipulation. Stewart, an early character from the TV show, wore a Winger t-shirt during the show's original run on MTV during the 1990s as well as its one-season revival in 2011. Characterized as a wimp who looked up to Beavis and Butt-head, he wore the shirt in an attempt to emulate the duo, whose shirts had the logos of AC/DC and Metallica.

After disbanding in 1994, bassist/lead vocalist Kip Winger went on to a solo career, guitarist Reb Beach went on to touring projects with artists Dokken, Alice Cooper and has held a permanent guitar spot in Whitesnake since 2002. The band's other members pursued or resumed careers as session musicians.

2000–2019
In 2001, it was announced that all original members of the band would return to the studio to record the song "On the Inside" for The Very Best of Winger. In 2002, all five members embarked on a reunion tour of the U.S. and Canada on a bill with Poison. According to Kip Winger, in a 2008 interview with rock and roll comic C.C. Banana, it was important to include all five members because "it was the big, long-awaited reunion so I wanted to include everybody who had ever been in the band." In 2003, it was confirmed that activity had been halted due to Reb Beach's touring commitment with Whitesnake as well as his solo album "Masquerade" and involvement with "supergroup" project The Mob with King's X frontman Doug Pinnick and Night Ranger drummer Kelly Keagy.

On July 16, 2005, it was announced that Kip Winger would perform as the lead singer for the Alan Parsons Live Project at the Common Ground Music Festival in Lansing, Michigan. In May 2006, it was confirmed that Winger had reformed without one of its original members Paul Taylor, to record another album and tour Europe. The album, IV, was released in Europe in October and the nine-country "Winger IV Tour" ran in the last two weeks of the same month.

On February 25, 2008, the band performed in Providence, Rhode Island, as part of a benefit for survivors of the Station nightclub fire. The concert, along with other artists was debuted on VH1 Classic on March 23, 2008. In late 2009, it was confirmed that Winger would record a fifth album Karma, with a tour to support it. Most recently, John Roth became the guitarist for Giant and would appear on their forthcoming album Promise Land then set for release in February/March 2010.

Winger released their sixth studio album titled, Better Days Comin' in April 2014, after teasers were published on Kip Winger's website and on the official Winger Facebook page as well.

As of late 2018, Winger was playing club dates. They were scheduled on December 29, 2018, in Westland, Michigan.

2020–present
According to a 2021 interview with guitarist Reb Beach, Winger are currently working on writing and recording a new album.

On March 10, 2023, they announced a new album, Seven, releasing on May 5th, and released a new single from the album, "Proud Desperado".

Style and influences
Kip Winger, in description of the band's musical ability and style, said, "Our band was known to musicians, and a lot of musicians showed up to see me play — watching, trying to figure out how I'm playing. We were like the 'hair band' [version of] Dream Theater."

Band members

Current members
 Kip Winger – lead vocals, bass, acoustic guitar, keyboards, piano 
 Reb Beach – lead and rhythm guitar, backing vocals, harmonica, keyboards, piano 
 Rod Morgenstein – drums, percussion, backing vocals, piano 
 Paul Taylor – keyboards, rhythm and lead guitar, backing vocals, piano 
 John Roth – rhythm and lead guitar, backing vocals, bass, keyboards 

Former members
 Cenk Eroglu – keyboards, rhythm and lead guitar, backing vocals 

Touring substitutes
 Donnie Wayne Smith – bass ; rhythm and lead guitar, backing vocals

Timeline

Discography

Studio albums
Winger (1988)
In the Heart of the Young (1990)
Pull (1993)
IV (2006)
Karma (2009)
Better Days Comin' (2014)
Seven (2023)

Notes

References

External links

 
Atlantic Records artists
Glam metal musical groups from New York (state)
Hard rock musical groups from New York (state)
Musical groups from New York City
Musical groups established in 1987
Musical groups disestablished in 1994
Musical groups reestablished in 2001
Musical groups disestablished in 2003
Musical groups reestablished in 2006
Musical quartets